was a village in Yama District, Fukushima Prefecture, Japan.

As of 2003, the village had an estimated population of 2,442 and a density of 54.46 persons per km². The total area was 44.84 km².

On January 4, 2006, Takasato, along with the towns of Shiokawa and Yamato, and the village of Atsushiokanō (all from Yama District), was merged into the expanded city of Kitakata.

External links
 Kitakata official website 

Dissolved municipalities of Fukushima Prefecture
Kitakata, Fukushima